The musket Modèle 1777, and later Modèle 1777 corrigé en l'an IX (Model 1777 corrected in the year IX, or 1800 in the French Revolutionary Calendar) was one of the most widespread weapons on the European continent.

It was part of a weapon family with numerous variants, e.g. for the light infantry, artillery and a musketoon for the cavalry.

Modèle 1777 corrigé en l' an IX 
After the French Revolutionary Wars, first consul Napoleon Bonaparte commissioned a rework; some minor modifications on the lock, bayonet and stock resulted in 1800 in the "corrected" model, also called "Modèle 1777 corrigé".

Other improvements 

The Musket was further improved in 1816 and 1822. Many were converted from flintlock to percussion cap in the mid-19th century.

Impact 
7 million muskets were produced, including variants 1800 (an IX), 1816 and 1822, but not including muskets like the Austrian 1798 or the Prussian 1809, which were mere clones of the French 1777. Until World War I, no other firearm was produced in such large numbers.

Properly trained French infantry were expected to be able to fire three volleys a minute with the 1777. A trained infantryman could hit a man sized target at 80 yards but anything further required an increasing amount of luck and the musket became wildly inaccurate at long range. Compared to the British Brown Bess, it fired musket balls that fitted more tightly into the barrel resulting in a better accuracy but a lower rate of fire and more fouling issues.

The Grande Armée marched into the German countries and left approx. 750,000 muskets retreating in 1815; until about 1840, French weapons were used in Germany.

See also 
 Charleville musket for predecessors of the Modèle 1777
 Brown Bess – English musket, "counterpart" to the 1777 in the Napoleonic Wars

Literature 
 Hans-Dieter Götz: Militärgewehre und Pistolen der deutschen Staaten 1800–1870, 2nd edition, Stuttgart, 1996,

References

External links 
Loading and Firing a French Musket in the Age of Napoleon
Detailed images of Replica

Firearms of France
Flintlock firearms
Muskets
18th-century weapons
French Revolutionary Wars
Napoleonic Wars
Hunting rifles

fr:Fusil Charleville
it:Moschetto Charleville
sh:Musketa Charleville